Vasile Tomoiagă (born 20 January 1964) is a retired rower from Romania. He competed at the 1984, 1988 and 1992 Olympics and won silver medals in the coxed pairs in 1984 and 1988. He won a silver and a bronze medal in this event at the 1985 and 1987 world championships, as well as a gold medal in the coxed fours in 1989.

References

1964 births
Living people
Romanian male rowers
Olympic rowers of Romania
Rowers at the 1984 Summer Olympics
Rowers at the 1988 Summer Olympics
Rowers at the 1992 Summer Olympics
Olympic silver medalists for Romania
Olympic medalists in rowing
Medalists at the 1988 Summer Olympics
Medalists at the 1984 Summer Olympics
World Rowing Championships medalists for Romania